Before the Dream Faded... is the second album of DIY guru Calvin Johnson.  It features production and instrumentation from such K Records regulars as Phil Elverum, Mirah, Khaela Maricich, Adam Forkner and Jona Bechtolt.  The album was released in October 2005 to mostly positive reviews.

Track listing
 "When Hearts Turn Blue" – 3:33
 "Rabbit Blood" – 2:51
 "Red Wing Black" – 5:09
 "Obliteration Overload" – 4:49
 "I Am Without" – 5:51
 "I'm Down" – 4:55
 "The Leaves of Tea" – 3:18
 "Your Eyes" – 4:22
 "Deliverance" – 3:35
 "When You Are Mine" – 8:10

2005 albums
Calvin Johnson (musician) albums
K Records albums